The following is a summary of the campaign of Clube Atlético Juventus in 2008, a football club based in São Paulo, São Paulo state, Brazil. For an overview of the club, see Clube Atlético Juventus.

Campeonato Paulista

16/01 - 16:00(GMT-0200) Juventus  1 x 1  Noroeste 
20/01 - 18:10(GMT-0200) Marília  4 x 0  Juventus 
24/01 - 19:30(GMT-0200) Juventus  3 x 1  Santos 
27/01 - 18:10(GMT-0200) Sertãozinho  3 x 0  Juventus 
30/01 - 16:00(GMT-0200) Juventus  3 x 2  Portuguesa Desp 
02/02 - 20:30(GMT-0200) São Caetano  0 x 3  Juventus 
07/02 - 21:45(GMT-0200) Ponte Preta  5 x 2  Juventus 
10/02 - 11:00(GMT-0200) Juventus  0 x 0  Gr Barueri 
16/02 - 16:00(GMT-0200) Juventus  0 x 4  Palmeiras 
21/02 - 19:30(GMT-0300) Mirassol  2 x 0  Juventus 
24/02 - 11:00(GMT-0300) Juventus  0 x 1  Guaratinguetá 
01/03 - 18:10(GMT-0300) Ituano  0 x 0  Juventus 
08/03 - 16:00(GMT-0300) Rio Claro  1 x 0  Juventus 
12/03 - 15:00(GMT-0300) Juventus  2 x 1  Paulista 
15/03 - 16:00(GMT-0300) Corinthians  2 x 2  Juventus 
23/03 - 18:10(GMT-0300) Bragantino  3 x 2  Juventus 
26/03 - 15:00(GMT-0300) Juventus  0 x 1  Rio Preto 
29/03 - 15:00(GMT-0300) Juventus  2 x 2  Guarani 
06/04 - 16:00(GMT-0300) São Paulo  3 x 1  Juventus

Copa Paulista de Futebol

20/07 - 11:00(GMT-0300) Bragantino 0 x 0 Juventus
27/07 - 10:00(GMT-0300) Juventus 3 x 1 AA Portuguesa
03/08 - 11:00(GMT-0300) Juventus 1 x 3 Santo André
06/08 - 15:00(GMT-0300) Nacional 4 x 5 Juventus
10/08 - 11:00(GMT-0300) Juventus  1 x 1 São José EC
17/08 - 11:00(GMT-0300) Flamengo 2 x 2 Juventus
24/08 - 11:00(GMT-0300) Juventus 4 x 2 São Bernardo
31/08 - 11:00(GMT-0300) Juventus 0 x 2 Bragantino
07/09 - 11:00(GMT-0300) AA Portuguesa 1 x 0Juventus
14/09 - 11:00(GMT-0300) Santo André 0 x 0 Juventus
17/09 - 15:00(GMT-0300) Juventus 1 x 0 Nacional
20/09 - 19:00(GMT-0300) São José EC 0 x 1 Juventus
28/09 - 11:00(GMT-0300) Juventus 1 x 0 Flamengo
04/10 - 11:00(GMT-0300) São Bernardo FC 2 x 0 Juventus
12/10 - 11:00(GMT-0300) Juventus 0  x 0 Sorocaba
15/10 - 19:30(GMT-0300) Comercial RP  2 x 2 Juventus
18/10 - 15:00(GMT-0300) Juventus 0  x 2 Mirassol
25/10 - 19:00(GMT-0200) Mirassol 4  x 3 Juventus
29/10 - 16:00(GMT-0200) Juventus 4  x 0 Comercial RP
02/11 - 11:00(GMT-0200) Sorocaba 3 x 2 Juventus

References

Federação Paulista de Futebol

Clube Atlético Juventus seasons
Juventus